Little Rock, Mississippi is an unincorporated community in Newton County, Mississippi. It lies along Little Rock Creek and Mississippi Highway 494 between Union and Meridian. It was the former site of Beulah Hubbard High School.

A post office under the name Little Rock first began operation in 1914.

Notable people
Kortney Clemons (born 1980), Paralympic athlete in track and field
Andy Ogletree (born 1998), amateur golfer, 2019 U.S. Amateur champion
Randy Reeves (born 1962), Under-Secretary of Veterans Affairs for Memorial Affairs (2017−present)

References 

Unincorporated communities in Newton County, Mississippi
Unincorporated communities in Mississippi